McNiven is a surname of Gaelic origin. It is derived from the Gaelic Mac Naoimhín. The latter surname is derived from a personal name based upon naomh ("holy", "saint"). The surname MacNiven can be rendered in Scottish Gaelic as Mac'IlleNaoimh.

Surname
Daniel McNiven
David McNiven (disambiguation), several people
David McNiven (footballer born 1955)
David McNiven (footballer born 1978)
Edward McNiven (1827–1858), English lawyer and cricketer 
Kate McNiven (date unclear), legendary Scottish witch
John McNiven (footballer) (born 1962), Scottish footballer
John G. McNiven
Julie McNiven, American actress and singer
Scott McNiven
Steve McNiven

Given name
David McNiven Garner

Citations

References

Surnames
Patronymic surnames